The GER Class D27 was a class of 2-2-2 steam tender locomotives designed by James Holden for the Great Eastern Railway.

History
In 1888 Holden experimented by removing the side rods of T19 No. 721 to form a 2-2-2. In 1889 the first of a new class appeared: initially No. 740 (later 789 and 780) which had been built on a 'Locomotive and Machinery' account. This was followed by two batches of ten on the more normal 'Letter' account. in 1893. They were built with  inside cylinders powered by a  boiler.

One of their main spheres was on the Joint Line working expresses to York. In 1896 the class inaugurated the epic making non-stop run to North Walsham using oil-firing. Rous-Martin found that the singles climbed Brentwood Bank more rapidly than the 2-4-0s. See also Ahrons (1951).

Nine locomotives were withdrawn between 1901 and 1903. The surviving eight locomotives in the 770-series were transferred to the duplicate list in July 1904, and had their number prefixed with a "0". The remaining fourteen were withdrawn between 1904 and 1907.

References

External links

  – Great Eastern Railway Society

D27
2-2-2 locomotives
Railway locomotives introduced in 1889
Standard gauge steam locomotives of Great Britain
Scrapped locomotives
Passenger locomotives